The Mitchell-Weeks House is a "Potomac Valley style" log farmhouse first built in 1789.   Descendants of builder Benjamin Mitchell lived in the house, located in Chantilly, Virginia just west of the intersection of Lee-Jackson Highway and Lee's Corner Road, until approximately 1940.  

Subsequent owners renovated and remodeled the house, but it currently preserves the Early American-era log front wall and stone chimneys.  The Fairfax County Park Authority erected a historical marker for the house in 2003.

References 

Houses in Fairfax County, Virginia
Log buildings and structures in Virginia
Houses completed in 1789